The Aru languages are a group of a dozen Austronesian languages spoken on the Aru Islands in Indonesia. None are spoken by more than ten thousand people. Although geographically close to Central Maluku languages, they are not part of that group linguistically (Ross 1995).

Languages
The following classification of the Aru languages is from Glottolog 4.0 (2019), and is arranged according to Hughes (1987: 96) since the Aru languages form an interconnected linkage or dialect chain:

Ujir-Kola-Kompane
Ujir
Kola-Kompane
Central Aru
Lola
Dobel-Koba
Lorang
Manombai
West Tarangan
East Tarangan
Karey-Barakai
Batuley-Mariri

References